Major David Manlun, KC (27 July 1985 - 7 June 2017) was an Indian Army Officer who was posthumously awarded the Kirti Chakra, India's second highest peace-time military decoration. He was from the First Battalion The Naga Regiment. 

Earlier, In August, 2016, he received the COAS Commendation Card for his extraordinary service.

Early life and education 
David was born on July 27, 1985, in Imphal, Manipur, to parents from the Churachandpur area of Manipur. His father's name is Subedar M Khamzalam (retd.) and mother's name is Nan Nuan Niang.

David had a passion for languages, and in addition to English, Hindi, and his native Zou, he was fluent in Mizo, Kuki, and Paite. David completed his 12th schooling from Army Public School, Shillong in 2003. He graduated from St Anthony's College, Shillong in the year 2006.

Military career 
Manlun was commissioned in the Indian Army's 1st Battalion of Naga Regiment as a lieutenant in March 2010 from the Officers Training Academy, Chennai through UPSC Combined Defence Services Examination. He joined the battalion in J& K at Naugam and remained there for the following two years, actively participating in various operations.

Maj David was assigned to 164 Infantry Battalion (TA) Naga Regiment in Nagaland in 2014 after serving as a peacekeeper in Bakloh, Himachal Pradesh. On August 15, 2016, he received the Chief of Army Staff Commendation for his outstanding service. Maj David had opted for deputation to the National Security Guard after nearly completing his stint in Nagaland, and his probation was set to commence on June 23, 2017.

Lappa Operation 
The military forces agreed to undertake a joint operation on 6 June 2017 after obtaining information reports concerning the presence of militants in the Lappa area, close to the Myanmar border. The militants were suspected to be members of the United Liberal Front of Assam (ULFA–I) and S.S. Khaplang factions of the National Socialist Council of Nagaland (NSCN–K), which were active in Nagaland's Mon district.

A combined unit of the 12th Para (SF) Battalion and the Naga Regiment's 164 Infantry Battalion of the Territorial Army conducted a joint operation. In the Lappa area of Nagaland's Mon district, the combined crew leapt into action and conducted a search and destroy mission. The location was about 325 kilometres from Nagaland's capital, Kohima, and 25 kilometres from the Myanmar border. When the terrorists opened fire on the team, Maj David was in charge. Maj David commanded from the front and directed his troops as they counter-attacked. Before making the ultimate sacrifice, Major David Manlun had  killed 4 Heavily armed ULFA terrorists. He was wounded and succumbed to his injuries during the intense gunfight. Inspired by his leadership, the team attacked the terrorists, and the successful operation resulted in the insurgents surrendering a large quantity of weaponry and ammunition.

Kirti Chakra 

David Manlun was awarded the Kirti Chakra, India's second highest peace-time military honour on 27 March 2018, at the Defence Investiture Ceremony–I, at Rashtrapati Bhavan, in New Delhi. His father Subedar M. Khamzalam (retd.) and mother Smt. Nan Nuan Niang received the honour for their deceased son from the President of India, R. N. Kovind.

Legacy 
 On May 23, 2018, Zonal president Rajinder Ahuja and Army Wives Welfare Association, opened the newly constructed auditorium of Army Public School (APS) Shillong, which was dedicated after Late Major David Manlun, Kirti Chakra.

See also 

 Kirti Chakra
 Naga Regiment
 List of Kirti Chakra award recipients

References

External links 
 Major David Manlun Profile

2017 deaths
Recipients of the Kirti Chakra
1985 births
Indian Army officers
Kirti Chakra